Berrac is a commune in the Gers department in southwestern France.

Geography

Population

Events
The town festival is held the second weekend in August.

See also
Communes of the Gers department

References

External links

 Tourism website

Communes of Gers